Sukrutham is a 1994 Malayalam-language film directed by Hari Kumar, written by  M. T. Vasudevan Nair. It stars Mammootty, Shanthi Krishna, Gautami and Manoj K. Jayan. The film is based on the subject of complex human relationships, inevitable human death and the consequences to the relatives of the deceased. Bombay Ravi had composed the songs while the background music was provided by Johnson. The film was critically acclaimed and won 2 national awards -  National Film Award for Best Feature Film in Malayalam and the National Film Award for Best Music Direction. The film is now considered to be a classic in Malayalam cinema.

Plot summary
Ravishankar is a journalist, who is a victim of blood cancer. The knowledge of his disease and the death on its way hugely disappoints him and he loses all his hope in life. He tries to arrange things in and around his life so that the people he care suffer the least due to his death. In an unheard of gesture, he even pressures his (initially horrified) wife Malini to get involved with their friend Rajendran so that she won't be alone after Ravi's death. Ravi goes back to his village to spend his last days with his aunt, where his childhood sweetheart and cousin, Durga, who is still unmarried starts taking care of him.

Meanwhile, a doctor who is a friend of Ravishankar convinces him to undergo holistic treatment at his centre. The centre is driven by a theme that each and every cell in our body has a mind which decides whether the body it belongs to should live or die. The treatment does wonders to Ravi and he is on his way to recovery and final checkups confirm that his blood count is normal. Ravi is delighted to come back to his life; but everything in his hope and joy of life is squandered when he realises that his death was more awaited than his recovery. Everybody, including the relatives, find it awkward to move on now that he is going to live rather than die, foiling all earlier plans. Ravi gets a lethal blow when even Durga, who clearly had no worldly motives, confesses that her affection was directed at a dying man, and not available anymore as he was going to live, and rejects his (borderline romantic) overtures as she clearly doesn't want to become a concubine. Back at his home, he gets his final blow when he realises that his recovery is a blow to even his wife, since Rajendran has by now started sleeping with her.

Ravi finally composes his own obituary in his office and commits suicide.

The final line to the audience is the old message that "death is the ultimate truth, an inevitable part of life" with an addendum that it can even be, "in its own way, a moment to rejoice".

Cast
Mammootty as Ravishankar
Shanthi Krishna as Durga
Gautami as Malini
Manoj K. Jayan as Rajendran
Kaviyoor Ponnamma as Cheriyamma
Shivaji
Narendra Prasad as Doctor Unni
Oduvil Unnikrishnan as Cheriyachan
Kuttyedathi Vilasini as Durga's Mother 
Krishna Kumar
V. K. Sreeraman as Doctor Rahim

Music
Bombay Ravi won the National Film Award for Best Music Direction in 1995 along with Parinayam. Background score was composed by Johnson and he won the second National Film Award for Best Music Direction in 1995. The lyrics were penned by O. N. V. Kurup.

Release

Reception 
The film was critically acclaimed. The film got 1995 National Film Awards for best feature film in Malayalam and best background score.

Box Office 
The film was a commercial success.

Awards
1994 : Filmfare Award for Best Film - Malayalam - M. M. Ramachandran (Film Producer)
1994 :	Ramu Kaaryatt Award for Best Actress - Malayalam - Gautami

References

External links

1994 films
1990s Malayalam-language films
Films with screenplays by M. T. Vasudevan Nair
Films shot in Kollam
Indian films about cancer
Films scored by Ravi
Best Malayalam Feature Film National Film Award winners